KYTF-LP (94.7 FM, "FM 94.7 Blair Radio") is a radio station licensed to serve the community of Blair, Nebraska. The station is owned by Blair Healing Rooms Inc and airs a community radio format.

The station was assigned the KYTF-LP call letters by the Federal Communications Commission on March 17, 2015.

References

External links
 Official Website
 FCC Public Inspection File for KYTF-LP
 

YTF-LP
YTF-LP
Radio stations established in 2017
2017 establishments in Nebraska
Community radio stations in the United States
Washington County, Nebraska